Sabahudin Delalić (born 17 August 1972, in Sarajevo) is a sitting volleyball player from Bosnia and Herzegovina. He is the current captain of the Bosnia and Herzegovina national team – ASOBiH. He has won four medals at Summer Paralympics. At the 2004 Summer Paralympics in Athens, he won gold medal as well as at the 2012 London Games. Also, he won silver medals at 2000 Summer Paralympics in Sydney and at 2008 Summer Paralympics in Beijing, where he was also bearer of national flag of Bosnia and Herzegovina.

He was also part of national team winning many medals on world and European championships.

Delalić is also active in politics. He is member of Party of Democratic Action and currently member of Assembly of Sarajevo Canton.

References

http://stara.oslobodjenje.ba/index.php?option=com_content&task=view&id=49751&Itemid=54

See also
 Bosnia and Herzegovina men's national sitting volleyball team

1972 births
Bosnia and Herzegovina men's sitting volleyball players
Volleyball players at the 2000 Summer Paralympics
Volleyball players at the 2004 Summer Paralympics
Volleyball players at the 2008 Summer Paralympics
Volleyball players at the 2012 Summer Paralympics
Volleyball players at the 2016 Summer Paralympics
Paralympic volleyball players of Bosnia and Herzegovina
Medalists at the 2000 Summer Paralympics
Medalists at the 2004 Summer Paralympics
Medalists at the 2008 Summer Paralympics
Medalists at the 2012 Summer Paralympics
Paralympic medalists in volleyball
Paralympic gold medalists for Bosnia and Herzegovina
Paralympic silver medalists for Bosnia and Herzegovina
Party of Democratic Action politicians
Sportspeople from Sarajevo
Living people
Medalists at the 2016 Summer Paralympics